Vox Vodka is an 80 proof wheat vodka made in the Netherlands by Beam Suntory.  Liquor ratings aggregator, Proof66.com, places Vox in the Top 10th percentile of the best vodkas in the world.

See also
List of vodkas

References

External links
Vox American site

Dutch brands
Dutch vodkas
Beam Suntory